On December 2, 1980, four Catholic missionaries from the United States working in El Salvador were raped and murdered by five members of the El Salvador National Guard (Daniel Canales Ramirez, Carlos Joaquin Contreras Palacios, Francisco Orlando Contreras Recinos, Jose Roberto Moreno Canjura, and Luis Antonio Colindres Aleman). The murdered missionaries were Maryknoll Sisters Maura Clarke and Ita Ford, Ursuline Dorothy Kazel, and lay missionary Jean Donovan.

Historical background
The Salvadoran Civil War began after a 1979 military coup brought the Revolutionary Government Junta to power. Catholic activists protested against the junta's oppression of impoverished citizens.  Óscar Romero, the Archbishop of San Salvador, was assassinated on March 24, 1980, while performing Mass. The four murdered Americans were involved in an international humanitarian aid mission which was accused by the régime of fomenting political opposition.

Murders
Kazel and Donovan, who were based in La Libertad, drove to El Salvador International Airport on the afternoon of December 2 to pick up two Maryknoll Sisters returning from a Maryknoll conference in Managua, Nicaragua. Kazel and Donovan were under surveillance by a National Guardsman at the time, who phoned his commander.  Acting on orders from the commander, five National Guardsmen changed out of uniform and continued to stake out the airport. Donovan and Kazel returned to pick up Clarke and Ford, who were returning from the same conference, on a flight due at 7:00 pm, which landed at  9:11 pm. The five Guardsmen stopped the four women's vehicle after they left the airport. They were taken to a relatively isolated spot where they were beaten, raped and murdered by the soldiers.

Peasants living nearby had seen the women's white van drive to an isolated spot at about 10 p.m. on December 2 and then heard machine gun fire followed by single shots, three hours after the flight was due. They saw five men flee the scene in the white van, with the lights on and the radio blaring. The van would be found later that night on fire at the side of the airport road. Later, the women's bodies were found knifed in a ditch.

Early the next morning, December 3, they found the bodies of the four women and were told by local authorities — a judge, three members of the National Guard, and two commanders — to bury them in a common grave in a nearby field. The peasants did so, but informed their parish priest, Fr. Paul Schindler, and the news reached Óscar Romero's successor Arturo Rivera y Damas and the United States Ambassador to El Salvador, Robert White.

Their shallow grave was exhumed the next day, December 4, in front of 15 reporters, Sisters Alexander and Dorsey and several missionaries, and Ambassador White. Donovan's body was the first exhumed; then Kazel's; then Clarke's; and last, that of Ita Ford. On December 5, a Mass of the Resurrection was said by Bishop Arturo Rivera y Damas; and on December 6, the bodies of Jean Donovan and Dorothy Kazel were flown out for burial. Donovan's body was returned to her parents in Sarasota, Florida, while Kazel's was taken back to her hometown of Cleveland, where she was buried in All Souls Cemetery in Chardon, Ohio. The bodies of the Maryknoll sisters, Clarke and Ford, were buried in Chalatenango, El Salvador, in keeping with Maryknoll practice.

Subsequent history
As news of the murders was made public in the United States, public outrage forced the U.S. government to pressure the Salvadoran regime to investigate. U.S. President Jimmy Carter suspended aid to El Salvador. The earliest investigations were condemned as whitewash attempts by the later ones, and in time, a Commission on the Truth for El Salvador was appointed by the United Nations to investigate who gave the orders, who knew about it, and who covered it up. Several low-level guardsman were convicted, and two generals were sued by the women's families in the U.S. federal courts for their command responsibility for the incident.

Unlike President Carter, succeeding U.S. President Ronald Reagan favored the Salvadoran military regime; he authorized increased military aid and sent more U.S. military advisers to the country to aid the government in quelling the civil/guerrilla war. His foreign policy advisor Jean Kirkpatrick declared her 'unequivocal' belief that the Salvadorean army was not responsible, adding that "the nuns were not just nuns. They were political activists. We ought to be a little more clear about this than we actually are." After the release of declassified documents in the 1990s, New Jersey congressman Robert Torricelli stated that it was "now clear that while the Reagan Administration was certifying human rights progress in El Salvador they knew the terrible truth that the Salvadoran military was engaged in a widespread campaign of terror and torture".

In El Salvador's Decade of Terror: Human Rights Since the Assassination of Archbishop Romero, Human Rights Watch reports:

In 1984, four national guardsmen—Daniel Canales Ramirez, Carlos Joaquin Contreras Palacios, Francisco Orlando Contreras Recinos and Jose Roberto Moreno Canjura—were convicted of murdering the four women and were sentenced to 30 years in prison. Their superior, sub-sergeant Luis Antonio Colindres Aleman, was also convicted for the murders.

According to the Maryknoll Sisters: The [1993] U.N.-sponsored Report of the Commission on the Truth for El Salvador concluded that the abductions were planned in advance and the men responsible had carried out the murders on orders from above. It further stated that the head of the National Guard and two officers assigned to investigate the case had concealed the facts to harm the judicial process. The murder of the women, along with attempts by the Salvadoran military and some American officials to cover it up, generated a grass-roots opposition in the U.S., as well as ignited intense debate over the Administration's policy in El Salvador.
In 1984, the defendants were found guilty and sentenced to 30 years in prison. The Truth Commission noted that this was the first time in Salvadoran history that a judge had found a member of the military guilty of assassination. In 1998, three of the soldiers were released for good behavior. Two of the men remain in prison and have petitioned the Salvadoran government for pardons.

The head of the National Guard, General Carlos Eugenio Vides Casanova, went on to become Salvadoran Minister of Defense in the government of José Napoleón Duarte. In 1998, the four assassins confessed to abducting, raping and murdering the four churchwomen and claimed that they did so because Aleman had informed them that they had to act on orders from high-level military officers. Some were then released from prison after detailing how Vides and his cousin Col. Oscar Edgardo Casanova Vejar, the local military commander in Zacatecoluca, had planned and orchestrated the executions of the churchwomen. A 16-year legal battle to deport Vides Casanova soon commenced.

Ita Ford's brother, attorney William P. Ford, spent more than 25 years using the U.S. court system to try to obtain justice for his sister and the other three murdered women.  He worked closely with Human Rights First (formerly the Lawyers Committee for Human Rights) on federal lawsuits to try to bring Salvadoran generals to answer for the murder of the women, and, in other cases, for the torture and murder of members of the Salvadoran poor. After their emigration to the U.S. state of Florida, Vides Casanova and his fellow general, José Guillermo García, were sued by the families of the four women in federal civil court. The case is styled Ford v. Garcia. The defense won the case. On February 24, 2012, however, a Federal immigration judge cleared the way for the deportation of Vides Casanova after the General was held liable for various war crimes which occurred under his command. On March 11, 2015, the Board of Immigration Appeals dismissed General Vides Casanova's appeal. Vides Casanova was then deported back to El Salvador on April 8, 2015.

Cultural depictions
Roses in December is a 1982 documentary about the murders, focusing on Jean Donovan. This documentary won the Interfilm Award at the 1982 International Filmfestival Mannheim-Heidelberg.

The dramatization Choices of the Heart won the 1984 Humanitas Prize in the 90-minute television movie category, although it was criticized for lacking clarity about the political context of the women's killings. Clarke, Ford, Kazel and Donovan were played by Mary McCusker, Mari Gorman, Pamela Bellwood, and Melissa Gilbert respectively. Helen Hunt, Martin Sheen, and Mike Farrell co-starred.

The murders were also depicted in Salvador, Oliver Stone's 1986 film about an American reporter trying to cover the overall conflict. In this film, actress Cynthia Gibb portrayed Cathy Moore, a character based on Jean Donovan. Moore is shown in several scenes interacting with the main character.

Points of Arrival: a Jean Donovan journey is a 1996 play written by Paul Amandes, developed by and starring Lisa Wagner and her Still Point Theater Collective, supported by Call to Action.

References

Further reading
 "Hearts on Fire: The Story of the Maryknoll Sisters", Penny Lernoux, et al., Orbis Books, 1995.
 "Salvador Witness: The Life and Calling of Jean Donovan", Ana Carrigan, Ballantine Books, 1986.
 "Witness of Hope: The Persecution of Christians in Latin America," Martin Lange and Reinhold Iblacker, Orbis Books, 1981.
 "Who Was Dorothy Kazel?" from the diocese of Cleveland Wayback Machine
 "Here I Am, Lord: The Letters and Writings of Ita Ford", Jeanne Evans (editor), Orbis Books, 2005.
 "A Radical Faith: The Assassination of Sister Maura", Eileen Markey, Nation Books, 2016.

External links
 Justice & The Generals: U.S. Law – Trial History supporting material for documentary first aired on PBS. Accessed October 7, 2005.
 Martyrdom in El Salvador on Maryknoll Sisters website. Accessed October 7, 2005.
 Plant a Tree in Dorothy Kazel's Memory Memorial program in El Salvador in honor of the four churchwomen, accessed online December 8, 2006.
 Report of the Commission on the Truth for El Salvador (1993) accessed online December 9, 2006.
 Not Just Nuns. Jacobin. May 15, 2017.

 
Assassinated American activists
Catholic martyrs of El Salvador
U.S. missionaries in El Salvador
Massacres of women
Roman Catholic missionaries in El Salvador
American Roman Catholic missionaries
Female Roman Catholic missionaries
American people murdered abroad
People murdered in El Salvador
People of the Salvadoran Civil War
Rape in El Salvador
20th-century Roman Catholic martyrs
Deaths by firearm in El Salvador
Wartime sexual violence
Women in war in Central America
Women in warfare post-1945
Violence against women in El Salvador